Maciste against the Sheik (Italian:Maciste contro lo sceicco) is a 1926 Italian silent adventure film directed by Mario Camerini and starring Bartolomeo Pagano, Franz Sala and Felice Minotti. It was part of the long-running Maciste series of Peplum films. At one point Maciste takes part in an underwater fight with a shark.

Cast
Bartolomeo Pagano as Maciste 
 Franz Sala     
 Felice Minotti  
 Cecyl Tryan
 Rita D'Harcourt
 Arnold Kent  
 Alex Bernard   
 Oreste Grandi    
 Armand Pouget
 Mario Saio
 F.M. Costa
 Michele Mikailoff

See also 
Samson Against the Sheik (1962)

References

Bibliography 
 Brunetta, Gian Piero. The History of Italian Cinema: A Guide to Italian Film from Its Origins to the Twenty-first Century. Princeton University Press, 2009.
 Gundle, Stephen. Mussolini's Dream Factory: Film Stardom in Fascist Italy. Berghahn Books, 2013.
 Ricci, Steven. Cinema and Fascism: Italian Film and Society, 1922–1943. University of California Press, 2008.

External links 
 

1926 films
Italian adventure films
Italian silent feature films
1920s Italian-language films
Films directed by Mario Camerini
1926 adventure films
Maciste films
Italian black-and-white films
Silent adventure films
1920s Italian films